Tony Dokoupil (born December 24, 1980) is an American broadcast journalist and author, known for his work as a co-anchor of CBS Mornings. He was also a news correspondent for CBS News and MSNBC.

Early life
Dokoupil, who is of Czech heritage, was born in Connecticut on December 24, 1980. His mother, Ann, worked as a teacher, while his father, Anthony, was a marijuana dealer. Growing up, Dokoupil was told of his father's involvement in real estate, which was a front. His family relocated to Miami shortly after he was born. Dokoupil and his mother relocated back to Maryland when he was six, where he attended Severna Park High School. He later studied business at George Washington University, graduating first in his class, and pursued media studies at Columbia University.

Career
From 2007 to 2013, Dokoupil was a senior writer at Newsweek magazine and the website The Daily Beast. In September 2013, he joined NBC News as a senior writer. He released a memoir titled The Last Pirate: A Father, His Son, and the Golden Age of Marijuana on April 1, 2014. He later became a reporter on MSNBC.

Following his departure from NBC News and MSNBC, Dokoupil joined CBS News as a New York-based correspondent in August 2016. On May 6, 2019, Dokoupil was named the new co-anchor of the morning program CBS This Morning; He made his debut on May 20. The program was renamed CBS Mornings in September 2021.

Personal life
Dokoupil has two children from a previous relationship. He married fellow broadcast journalist Katy Tur in October 2017, and they have two children together.

References

External links

21st-century American journalists
American television news anchors
American television reporters and correspondents
CBS News people
MSNBC people
American memoirists
Journalists from Florida
American people of Czech descent
1980 births
Living people